Bhatpar Rani is a constituency of the Uttar Pradesh Legislative Assembly covering the city of Bhatpar Rani in the Deoria district of Uttar Pradesh, India.

Bhatpar Rani is one of five assembly constituencies in the Lok Sabha constituency of Salempur. Since 2008, this assembly constituency is numbered 340 amongst 403 constituencies.

Members of Legislative Assembly

Election results

2022 
Sabhakunwar Kushwaha from Party BJP won the seat of legislative Assembly by defeating Ashutosh Upadhyay.

2017
Samajwadi Party candidate Ashutosh Upadhyay won in last Assembly election of 2017 Uttar Pradesh Legislative Elections defeating Bharatiya Janta Party candidate Jayanth Kushwaha by a margin of 11,097 votes.

References

External links
 

Assembly constituencies of Uttar Pradesh